Malapterurus punctatus is a species of electric catfish native to Côte d'Ivoire, Guinea, Liberia and Sierra Leone. This species grows to a length of  SL.

References

Malapteruridae
Catfish of Africa
Freshwater fish of West Africa
Taxa named by Steven Mark Norris
Fish described in 2002
Strongly electric fish